Holly Faye Cook-Tanner is an American former competitive figure skater. She is the 1990 World and 1990 U.S. national bronze medalist. She was coached by Kris Sherard.

Cook is a member of the Church of Jesus Christ of Latter-day Saints. She is a graduate of Viewmont High School in Bountiful, Utah, class of 1989. She is a mother of four and toured with Champions on Ice. She now coaches at the South Davis Recreation Center in Bountiful, Utah.

Competitive highlights

References

American female single skaters
Figure skaters from Salt Lake City
Latter Day Saints from Utah
Living people
World Figure Skating Championships medalists
Year of birth missing (living people)
21st-century American women
20th-century American women